Tom Stephan (born June 6, 1970) is an American house music, producer, DJ and film director. He was born in New York, United States. He is also known as Superchumbo.

Biography
In 1990, Stephan relocated to London, England and studied film at the London Film School where he directed “21st Century Nuns”. The short documentary featured an interview by British artist, film-maker and AIDS activist Derek Jarman.

Discography

Albums

Original productions 
 Bart Skils ft Superchumbo - All Over My Body [Drumcode DC246] 2021
 David Tort & Tom Stephan - Music’s In Me [HoTL Records] 2017
 Tom Stephan & Danny Verde ft Rowetta - Feel It [Get Down] 2016
 Superchumbo — Wowie Zowie Album [Twisted America] 2005
 Superchumbo featuring Celeda — Dirtyfilthy [Twisted America] 2004
 Superchumbo — This Beat Is [Twisted America] 2003
 Superchumbo & Victoria Wilson-James — The Revolution [Twisted America] 2002
 Tracy & Sharon — Terrific / Filthy Hetero [Flesh UK/Omnisonus FR] 1994

Remixes 
 Sting - If You Love Somebody Set Them Free (Tom Stephan Mix) [A&M] 2019
 Lenny Kravitz - Low (Tom Stephan Mix) [BMG] 2018
 Beyonce - Partition (Tom Stephan Mix) [Columbia] 2014
 Seductive - Take Control (Tom Stephan Mix) [Spinnin] 2010
 Fierce Ruling Diva - You Gotta Believe (Superchumbo mixes) [React /Tommy Boy] 2002
 Basement Jaxx - Get Me Off (Superchumbo 'Supergetoff' Remix) [XL] 2002
 Missy Elliott - Get Ur Freak On (Superchumbo's Superfreakon Remix) [Elektra] 2002
 Kylie Minogue - Can't Get You Out Of My Head (Superchumbo Mixes) [Parlophone] 2001
 Tina Turner - When The Heartache Is Over (Superchumbo's Crystal Mix) [DMC] 2000
 Pet Shop Boys - New York City Boy (Superchumbo Remixes) [EMI] 1999

DJ mix albums 
 Nervous Nitelife [Nervous Records] 2009
 Asseteria - Live from NYC [Nervous Records] 2008
 Let’s Go Chumbo [ChumboMundo] 2006
 Roger Sanchez / Tom Stephan - Afterdark Vol.1 [Stealth] 2005
 Nite:Life 018 - These Beats Are... [NRK] 2004
 Superchumbo - Get the Lead Out! [Twisted] 2002
 Superchumbo - Leadhead [Loaded] 2002
 Soundworx - Session Two [Soundworx UK] 2001
 Drag Addict [Hut Recordings] 1996
 Just a Drag…Queen [Omnisonus FR] 1995

Productions 
 Kevin Aviance - Join In The Chant [Wave] 1999

Co-productions 
 Robbie Williams - There Are Bad Times Just Around The Corner [KALA] 1999

Performer 
 Rufus Wainwright – Tiergarten (additional programming) [Geffen] 2007
 Pet Shop Boys - Integral (additional vocals) [Parlophone] 2007
 Pet Shop Boys - Screaming (additional keyboards) Psycho Motion Picture Soundtrack [Geffen] 1998

Number One Billboard US Dance singles 
 Sting - If You Love Somebody Set Them Free 2019
 Lenny Kravitz - Low 2018
 HiFi Sean ft Crystal Waters - Testify 2017
 Yoko Ono - Hell in Paradise 2016
 Robin S & DJ Escape - Shout it out loud 2016
 Beyonce - Partition 2014
 Beyonce - Pretty Hurts 2014
 Ono - Angel 2014
 Ono - Walking on Thin Ice 2013
 Shakira – Did It Again 2010
 Kristine W - Be Alright 2009
 Africanism - Hard 2006
 Superchumbo - Dirtyfilthy 2004
 Seal - Get it together 2003
 Superchumbo - This Beat Is 2003
 Murk - Believe 2003
 Kylie - Can’t Get You Out Of My Head 2002
 Fierce Ruling Diva - You Gotta Believe 2002
 Superchumbo - Irresistible 2002
 Pet Shop Boys - NYC Boy 1999

References

External links
DJ/Producer Tom Stephan Official website
Superchumbo MySpace site
Interview with Tom Stephan at Twistedhouse

1970 births
Living people
American electronic musicians
American house musicians
Club DJs
Remixers
People from Cattaraugus County, New York